Yasser Salem (Arabic:ياسر سالم) (born 12 October 1986) is an Emirati footballer who plays as a right back.

External links

References

Emirati footballers
1986 births
Living people
Al Urooba Club players
Al-Wasl F.C. players
Dibba FC players
Fujairah FC players
UAE First Division League players
UAE Pro League players
Association football defenders